Charlton Hall may refer to:
Charlton Hall, Northumberland, an English country house
, a cargo ship named after the English house
Charlton Hall Plantation House, Laurens County, South Carolina